ETO FC Győr (Egyetértés Torna Osztály Futball Club Győr;  Concordance Gymnastics Department Football Club of Győr) or just ETO, is a football club from the city of Győr in Hungary. They are best known for reaching the semi-finals of the European Cup 1964-65. The club has won the Hungarian League four times. In 1904 the club was founded as Győri Vagongyár ETO and has undergone many name changes since. The colours of the club are green and white.

History

Crest and colours
The colours of the club are green and white. This combination of colours is very common in Hungary, as it is also used by clubs such as Ferencváros, Szombathelyi Haladás, Paks. The crest of the club includes a cock sitting on a cross.

Naming history
1904: Győri Vagongyár ETO
1950: Győri Vasas SC ETO
1952: Győri Vasas
1953: Vasas SE Győr
1954: Wilhelm Pieck Vasas ETO SK Győr
1957: Magyar Wilhelm Pieck Vagon- és Gépgyár ETO Győr
1957: Győri Vasas ETO
1965: Rába ETO Győr
1985: Győri ETO FC
1992: Rába ETO FC Győr
1994: Győri ETO FC
2015: ETO FC Győr
2017: WKW ETO FC Győr

Manufacturers and shirt sponsors
The following table shows in detail Győri ETO FC kit manufacturers and shirt sponsors by year:

Stadium

The home of the club is the multi-purpose stadium ETO Park. It was opened in 2008 as a replacement for Stadion ETO. Its capacity is 16,000 but if necessary the stadium can be expanded in order to host 30,000 spectators. The stadium complex also includes three grass practice pitches and one synthetic practice pitch, as well as two indoor pitches. A hotel can be found next to the pitch. The stadium can also host cultural events such as concerts and exhibitions. The style of the stadium is 'a la English' that is open at the corners.

The stadium is also home to the national team of Hungary. On 3 March 2010 Hungary drew with Russia in a friendly match. 16,000 spectators attended the match.

On 29 February 2012, Hungary hosted Bulgaria in a friendly match. Although Szalai scored in the 42nd minute, a late equalizer was delivered by Bozhinov.

On 7 June 2013, Csaba Tarsoly said that the ETO Park is unique in Hungary that it was built without any governmental support. The facility corresponds to the UEFA stadium criteria, except for the fact that a UEFA Champions League or UEFA Europa League final cannot be played at the stadium since it is not able to host 30,000 spectators.

Ownership
On 14 June 2001, the Quaestor Financial Hrurira Kft bought the club and the stadium from the Rába Rt.

On 12 May 2013, Csaba Tarsoly, the president of the club, said that he had been waiting for this winning of the Hungarian League for 12 years.

On 9 March 2015, the Quaestor Financial Hrurira Kft. went bankrupt.

On 14 March 2015, the Audi finished supporting the club due to the unpredictability caused by the bankruptcy of the Quaestor Financial Hrurira Kft.

On 22 April 2015, the mayor of Győr, Zsolt Borkai said that the club will compete either in the Nemzeti Bajnokság III or in the county championship from the 2015–16 season due to the fact that the club will not be able to receive license from the Hungarian Football Federation since the club has amassed a 200 million HUF of debt.

On 23 April 2015, it was revealed that an English investor is interested in the club.

The promotion to the 2017–18 Nemzeti Bajnokság II aroused the interest of different investor. Among the investors there is a Belgian group who showed interest in purchasing the club and their estates.

Supporters and rivalries

The supporters of the club are mainly from the city of Győr and the neighbouring area. However, the club have supporters from all over the country.
Győr have a strong local rivalry with neighbouring clubs such as Szombathelyi Haladás and Zalaegerszeg. However, the club's historic rivals come from Budapest, due to the fierce competition between Győr, Ferencváros and Budapest Honvéd in the early 1980s. Currently the club are in rivalry with the most successful clubs of the country such as Debrecen and Videoton.

Honours

Domestic
Nemzeti Bajnokság I
 Winners (4): 1963, 1981–82, 1982–83, 2012–13
Runners-up (3): 1983–84, 1984–85, 2013–14
Third place (6): 1967, 1973–74, 1985–86, 2007–08, 2009–10, 2011–12
Nemzeti Bajnokság III
 Winners (1): 2016–17
Magyar Kupa
 Winners (4): 1965, 1966, 1967, 1978–79
Runners-up: 1964, 1983–84, 2008–09, 2012–13
Szuperkupa
 Winners (1): 2013

European

European Cup
Semi-finals: 1964–65

Current squad
As of 5 August 2022.

Out on loan

Reserve
See also Győri ETO FC II.

Non-playing staff

Board of directors

Management

Other departments
Győri ETO has several successful departments, e.g., the handball teams won many national championships. The men's team also won the EHF Cup in 1986 as Rába Vasas ETO Győr. Particularly well known these days are the handball ladies, playing as Győri ETO Kézilabda Club (en. handball club), which is a five-time Champions League winner team.

References

External links

Official website 

 
Association football clubs established in 1904
Sport in Győr
1904 establishments in Hungary